Roxanne Roux (born 10 November 2001) is an Australian rules footballer playing for the Fremantle Football Club in the AFL Women's (AFLW). Roux was drafted by Fremantle with their first selection, 12th overall, in the 2019 AFL Women's draft.

Roux lived in Dongara in the Mid West region of Western Australia until she was unable to play football in girls teams, so her family moved back to Perth and she played for East Fremantle in the West Australian Women's Football League (WAWFL).

Career
Roux debuted in against Geelong in Round 1 of 2020, kicking a goal and leaving her mark with a crunching tackle.

References

External links 

Living people
2001 births
Fremantle Football Club (AFLW) players
Australian rules footballers from Western Australia
Australian people of Zimbabwean descent